The 1883 Massachusetts gubernatorial election was held on November 6.

Governor Benjamin Butler ran for re-election on a fusion ticket between the Democratic Party and the Greenback Labor Party but was defeated by Republican U.S. Representative George D. Robinson.

In the concurrent but separate election for Lieutenant Governor, Republican Oliver Ames was re-elected to a second term.

Republican nomination

Candidates
George D. Robinson, U.S. Representative from Chicopee

Declined
 Henry L. Pierce, former Mayor of Boston

Results

General election

Results

See also
 1883 Massachusetts legislature

References

Governor
1883
Massachusetts
November 1883 events